Dean Anthony Crowe (born 6 June 1979) is an English former footballer.

Career
Crowe shot to prominence at Stoke City as a youngster with his goalscoring exploits, when handed a place in the team. However, Crowe fell out of favour and departed on loan to several clubs before being released by Stoke in 2001.

Crowe signed for Luton Town, after a successful loan spell prior to his departure from Stoke. Crowe scored 12 goals in 43 starts for Luton, however a broken leg halted his progress in March 2003. He could not hold down a regular starting place and joined York City on loan in 2003. He signed for Oldham Athletic in early 2004, but only made 5 appearances at the club before leaving.

He had a brief trial at Stafford Rangers before joining Leek Town in September 2004. He then returned to the professional game, when he signed for Stockport County on non-contract terms in August 2005, but only made one start for the club prior to being released in February 2006.

Crowe joined non-league Witton Albion in 2006. He then spent some time out of the game to work on his fitness, before re-signing for Witton ahead of the 2007–08 season. However, his fitness never reached the level required by the Northern Premier League leaders, and he was released in late November, having made little impact on those occasions when he appeared for the club. In December 2009 Crowe joined Leek Town and went on to make his first appearance in the 2–2 draw against Quorn. He later went on to play for New Mills.

Career statistics
Source:

Honours
 Luton Town
 Football League Third Division runner-up: 2001–02

References

External links

1979 births
Living people
Footballers from Stockport
English footballers
Association football forwards
Cheadle Town F.C. players
Stoke City F.C. players
Leek Town F.C. players
Scarborough F.C. players
York City F.C. players
Northampton Town F.C. players
Bury F.C. players
Plymouth Argyle F.C. players
Luton Town F.C. players
Oldham Athletic A.F.C. players
Stockport County F.C. players
Northern Premier League players
New Mills A.F.C. players
Witton Albion F.C. players
English Football League players